Patricia Morhet-Richaud (born 28 July 1961) is a member of the French Senate representing the department of Hautes-Alpes.

Early career
Before entering politics, Morhet-Richaud worked for an agricultural cooperative.

Political career
Morhet-Richaud was elected to the French senate on 28 December 2014 following the death of senator Jean-Yves Dusserre. She succeeded her father Claude Morhet as mayor of the commune of Lazer in 2007. Morhet-Richaud was first elected to the municipal council for Lazer in 2001.

Political positions
In the Republicans’ 2016 presidential primaries, Morhet-Richaud endorsed Bruno Le Maire as the party's candidate for the office of President of France.

References 

1961 births
Living people
Women mayors of places in France
French Senators of the Fifth Republic
20th-century French women politicians
Women members of the Senate (France)
Senators of Hautes-Alpes